The canton of Chantelle is a former administrative division in central France. It was disbanded following the French canton reorganisation which came into effect in March 2015. It consisted of 15 communes, which joined the canton of Gannat in 2015. It had 5,310 inhabitants (2012).

The canton comprised the following communes:

Barberier
Chantelle
Chareil-Cintrat
Charroux
Chezelle
Deneuille-lès-Chantelle
Étroussat
Fleuriel
Fourilles
Monestier
Saint-Germain-de-Salles
Target
Taxat-Senat
Ussel-d'Allier
Voussac

Demographics

See also
Cantons of the Allier department

References

Former cantons of Allier
2015 disestablishments in France
States and territories disestablished in 2015